Aspistor hardenbergi is a species of sea catfish in the family Ariidae. It was described by Patricia J. Kailola in 2000, originally under the genus Arius. It inhabits tropical marine and brackish waters in southern New Guinea.

The species epithet, "hardenbergi", was given in honour of J.D.F. Hardenberg, both for his contributions to ichthyology in the Indo-Australian region, and for his recognition that A. hardenbergi was a new species.

References

Ariidae
Taxa named by Patricia J. Kailola
Fish described in 2000